Waltraud Schale is a retired East German slalom canoeist who competed in the late 1950s. She won two medals at the 1957 ICF Canoe Slalom World Championships in Augsburg with a gold in the mixed C-2 team event and a bronze in the mixed C-2 event.

References

East German female canoeists
Possibly living people
Year of birth missing (living people)
Place of birth missing (living people)
Medalists at the ICF Canoe Slalom World Championships